The Opera Band is the debut album by Amici Forever released in 2004.

Making of the album

The members of Amici Forever met when rehearsing and performing at opera venues around the world. Tenor Geoff Sewell, originally from New Zealand, came up with the idea of an "opera band" mixing traditional opera with contemporary pop. The band features two tenors, two soprano singers and a bass-baritone singer.

Amici Forever signed with Arista Records and started playing high-profile gigs such as the FA Cup final and the English rugby union final. Nick Patrick, who had produced albums by the Gipsy Kings, Tina Turner and Marvin Gaye produced the band's first album The Opera Band. The album mixes opera classics such as "Nessun Dorma" with pop standards such as "Unchained Melody" and "Requiem for a Soldier" from the Band of Brothers soundtrack.

Track listing
"Prayer in the Night" (based on Handel's "Sarabande")
"Senza Catene (Unchained Melody)"
"Canto Alla Vita"
"Vita Mia"
"Requiem for a Soldier "
"Whisper of Angels" (based on Faure's "Pavane")
"The Pearl Fishers"
"Soave Sia Il Vento"
"Nimrod: Lux Æterna"
"Song to the Moon"
"Zadok the Priest"
"Nessun Dorma"
"Adeste Fidelis"
"Olympia: Eternal Flame" (Bonus track used as theme to BBC's 2004 Olympic Games coverage)

Charts

Weekly chart

Year-end chart

Certifications

External links
 Music Guide The Opera Band page
 Music Guide The Opera Band page

References

Amici Forever albums
2004 debut albums